This is a list of ambassadors of the United States to Malta. Initially a part of the British Empire, Malta was granted full independence as the State of Malta on September 21, 1964. The United States recognized the new nation and established full diplomatic relations after its independence, and retained relations after Malta became a republic in 1974. Harrison Lewis was appointed as the first American diplomat in Malta as Chargé d'Affaires ad interim until an ambassador could be commissioned.

Embassy

The Embassy of the United States in Malta was first established in the capital Valletta, on September 21, 1964. It eventually moved to Sliema, and in 1974 it moved again to Floriana, a suburb of the Maltese capital. On 4 July 2011, the embassy was moved once again to a larger complex in Ta' Qali National Park in Attard. The embassy's website still lists its location as "Valletta".

The ambassador's official residence is Villa Apap Bologna, also located in Attard.

Ambassadors

See also
 Malta–United States relations
 Foreign relations of Malta
 Ambassadors of the United States

Notes

References

 United States Department of State: Background notes on Malta

External links
 United States Department of State: Chiefs of Mission for Malta
 United States Department of State: Malta
 United States Embassy in Valletta

Malta
United States